Jánošík is a 1935 Czechoslovak drama film directed by Martin Frič.

Cast

 Paľo Bielik as Juraj Jánosík
 Zlata Hajdúková as Anka
 Andrej Bagar as Master Sándor
 Theodor Pištěk as Count Andre Markusovský
 Filip Davidik as Janicko, shepherd boy
 Kudo Bachlet as A Janosik "Brigand"
 Mirko Eliás as A Janosik "Brigand"
 Martin Hollý as A Janosik "Brigand"
 Jindřich Plachta as A Janosik "Brigand"
 Jan W. Speerger as A Janosik "Brigand"
 Ladislav H. Struna as A Janosik "Brigand"
 Jan Sviták as A Janosik "Brigand"
 Kudo Uhlar as A Janosik "Brigand"
 Otto Zahrádka as A Janosik "Brigand"

Reception
Writing for The Spectator in 1936, Graham Greene gave the film a poor review. Noting that the theme of robbing the rich to give to the poor "should retain its appeal until the Millennium", Greene found that the "romantic rollicking tuneful" beginning jarred sharply with the film's conclusion which sees the robber's "cruel death, hung like butcher meat with a spike in his ribs". As Greene sardonically observes, "Romance and robber tunes and lyrical shots of a long-legged Fairbanks hero don't go with the spike."

References

External links
 

1935 films
1930s adventure drama films
1930s Czech-language films
Czechoslovak black-and-white films
Films directed by Martin Frič
Czech adventure drama films
Czech historical adventure films
Czechoslovak drama films
1930s historical adventure films
1935 drama films
1930s Czech films